Yuhi Amuli is a film director, screenwriter and producer from Rwanda.

Background 
After dropping out of law school in 2014, he attended several screenwriting and directing workshops worldwide; including Maisha Film Lab in 2014. He is an alumnus of Berlinale Talents.

His directorial debut feature film A Taste Of Our Land (2020) premiered at the Pan African Film Festival in Los Angeles and won the Jury Award for Best First Narrative Feature Film. The film won the African Movie Academy Awards (2020) for Best First Feature Film by a Director.

Along with his own work in film, he served as the Public Relations Officer for the Mashariki African Film Festival in Kigali for a five year period.

Filmography 

 Ishaba (2015)
 Akarwa (2017) 
 Kazungu (2018)
 A Taste Of Our Land (2020)

References 

Living people

Year of birth missing (living people)
Rwandan film directors
21st-century screenwriters
Rwandan film producers